白 may refer to:
Radical 106, one of the Kangxi radicals used for indexing Chinese characters
Bai (surname), Chinese surname
Baek, Korean surname
Bai people, ethnic group in China

See also

White, the literal meaning of this character